This article lists Jews deported by the Nazis from Wageningen (Gelderland) and neighboring municipalities in the Netherlands during World War II.

Municipality of Wageningen

Residents of Wageningen
 Alexander, Juliana-Beatrix (b. January 1, 1939, Rotterdam; d. September 17, 1943 (age 4), Auschwitz)
 Alexander, Karl Israel (b. June 12, 1887, Rogasen; d. July 25, 1943 (age 56), Westerbork)
 Berger, Geza (b. August 2, 1892, Budapest, Hungary; d. September 30, 1942 (age 50), Auschwitz)
 Cassiver, Ilse (wife of K.I. Alexander), (b. August 26, 1908, Breslau; d. September 17, 1943 (age 35), Auschwitz)
 Cohen, Sophia-Hendrika (b. April 7, 1903, Wageningen; d. February 6, 1944 (age 40), Auschwitz)
 Gelder, Bernhard van, student at the Wageningen University and Research (Landbouwhogeschool Nederland) (b. February 23, 1916, The Hague; d. September 24, 1943 (age 27), Auschwitz)
 Gernsheim, Helena (widow of J. Weidenreich), (b. October 15, 1867, Worms, Germany; d. April 23, 1943 (age 76), Sobibor)
 Meijer, Lodewijk (b. July 8, 1919, Amsterdam; d. September 24, 1943 (age 24), Auschwitz)
 Meijer, Ottilie Sara (widow of B. Beijer), (b. December 15, 1874, Maagdenburg, Germany; d. April 16, 1943 (age 69), Sobibor)
 Ostermann, Laura Wilhelmina Sara (wife of R.I. Loewenthal), (b. March 13, 1874, Berlin; d. May 21, 1943 (age 69), Sobibor)
 Pinkhof, Juda, student at the Landbouwhogeschool Nederland (b. July 11, 1921, Amsterdam; d. November 3, 1942 (age 21), Auschwitz)
 Rippe, Jacques (b. March 16, 1878, Brielle; d. July 2, 1943 (age 65), Sobibor)
 Sanders, Henrij (b. December 26, 1861, Gouda; d. November 5, 1942 (age 80), Auschwitz)
 Waal, Rachel van de (wife of J. Rippe), (b. October 9, 1879; d. July 2, 1943 (age 63), Sobibor)

Municipality of Ede

Residents of Bennekom 
 Frankenthal, Gunther (b. September 18, 1929, Leipzig, Germany; d. February 28, 1945 (age 15), Auschwitz)
 Frankenthal, Ludwig-Israel (b. November 27, 1885, Schwanfeld, Germany; d. October 14, 1944 (age 68), Auschwitz)
 Frankenthal, Wolfgang (b. June 10, 1931, Leipzig; d. October 14, 1944 (age 13), Auschwitz)
 Kropveld, Elsiene Helena (wife of Alexander Woude), (b. August 3, 1909, Amsterdam; d. March 6, 1944 (age 34), Auschwitz)
 Kutnewsky, Editha-Charlotte (widow of J. Blode), (b. March 4, 1889, Berlin; unknown)
 Roos, Betje, (b. February 28, 1878, Rotterdam; d. April 16, 1943 (age 65), Sobibor)
 Sprecher, Hermann, student at the Landbouwhogeschool Nederland (b. May 13, 1919, Rotterdam; d. October 10, 1942 (age 23), Auschwitz)
 Woude, Alexander (Alex, Lex) van der (b. April 25, 1900, Amsterdam; d. March 6, 1944 (age 43), Auschwitz)
 Woude, Henriette Frederika (Jetje) van der (b. February 14, 1935, Wageningen; d. March 6, 1944 (age 9), Auschwitz)
 Woude, Louis Hein (Loekie) van der (b. July 2, 1932, Wageningen; d. March 6, 1944 (age 11), Auschwitz)

Municipality of Renkum

Residents of Renkum 
 Hartogson, Fanny (wife of Emanuel Manasse), (b. May 14, 1885, Embden, Germany; d. April 9, 1943 (age 57), Sobibor)
 Manasse, Emanuel Alexander (b. November 21, 1882, Renkum; d. April 9, 1943 (age 60), Sobibor)

Municipality of Rhenen

Residents of Rhenen 
 Frank, Sally-Heinz (b. March 17, 1920, Dorrmoschel, Germany; d. December 25, 1943 (age 23), Auschwitz)
 Klaueren-Haas, Magdelena van (b. August 1, 1870, Almelo; d. April 23, 1943 (age 72), Sobibor)

See also
 History of Wageningen
 History of the Jews in the Netherlands
 History of the Netherlands (1939-1945)
 List of Jews deported from the Netherlands

References

Notes

Further reading
 Steenbergen, A.G. 2002. Een eerlijcke plaets: memorboek van joods Wageningen en omgeving (Memory book of Jewish Wageningen and surroundings). Wageningen: Stichting Joods Gedenkteken.

External links
 De Casteelse Poort Museum
 "Wageningen", Jewish Historical Museum of the Netherlands
 Digital Monument to the Jewish Community of the Netherlands (in Dutch)
 Wageningen Jewish Heritage Foundation (in Dutch), including biographies of some of those deported

Wageningen
Wageningen
History of Gelderland
History of Utrecht (province)
History of Renkum
History of Wageningen
Ede, Netherlands
Rhenen